The Cincinnati Kid is a 1965 soundtrack album to the film The Cincinnati Kid, starring Steve McQueen.  It features "The Cincinnati Kid", as sung by Ray Charles, which can be heard near the end of the film. The rest of the album contains film music composed by Lalo Schifrin.

Track listing

Personnel
Lalo Schifrin - composer, arranger
Ray Charles - vocals (track 1)
Al Porcino - trumpet
Milt Bernhart - trombone
John Kitzmiller - tuba
Bill Holman - saxophone
Justin Gordon - clarinet
Tommy Tedesco, Alton Hendrickson - guitar
Keith Mitchell - bass
Stanley Levey, Victor Feldman - drums, percussion
Tommy Morgan - harmonica
Erno Neufeld, Alexander Murray, Anatol Kaminsky, Sam Freed, Nathan Kaproff, Jacob Krachmalnick, George Kast, David Frisina - violin
Virginia Majewski, Robert Ostrowsky, Myra Kestenbaum - viola
Edgar Lustgarten, Eleanor Slatkin - cello
Robert Helfer - orchestra manager
Orchestra conducted by Robert Armbruster

References

Sources
MGM Records SE-4313

External links
 Album summary

1965 soundtrack albums
MGM Records soundtracks
Lalo Schifrin soundtracks
Albums conducted by Lalo Schifrin
Drama film soundtracks